The 2018 season is IK Start's first season back in the Eliteserien following their relegation at the end of the 2016 season.

Season events
Prior to the start of the season, IK Start appointed Mark Dempsey as their new manager. After a run of poor results, Dempsey was fired on 18 May 2018, Mick Priest taking over as Interim Manager.Kjetil Rekdal took over on a permanent basis on May 30th.

Squad
As of 31 August 2018.

Out on loan

Transfers

Winter

In:

Out:

}

}

}

Summer

In:

Out:

}

Competitions

Eliteserien

Results summary

Results by round

Results

Table

Norwegian Cup

Squad statistics

Appearances and goals

|-
|colspan="14"|Players away from Start on loan:

|-
|colspan="14"|Players who appeared for Start no longer at the club:

|}

Goal scorers

Disciplinary record

References 

2018
Start